Biggleswade Football Club is a football club based in Biggleswade, Bedfordshire, England.

History
The club was established in 2016, based on Biggleswade Town's under-18 side. They applied to join the Spartan South Midlands League for the 2016–17 season and were placed in Division One. They won the division at the first attempt, earning promotion to the Premier Division. In 2018–19 the club won the Premier Division and Premier Division Cup double, and were promoted to Division One Central of the Southern League.

Ground
The club played at Biggleswade Town's Langford Road ground until the curtailment of the 2020–21 season. In February 2021 they announced that they would groundshare with Bedford Town for the 2021–22 season.

Honours
Spartan South Midlands League
Premier Division champions 2018-19
Division One champions: 2016–17
Premier Division Cup winners 2018–19
North Beds Charity Cup
Winners 2018–19

Records
Best FA Cup performance: Second qualifying round, 2019–20, 2020–21
Best FA Trophy performance: First qualifying round, 2020–21
Best FA Vase performance: Quarter-finals, 2018–19

References

External links
Official website

Football clubs in England
Football clubs in Bedfordshire
Association football clubs established in 2016
2016 establishments in England
Biggleswade
Spartan South Midlands Football League
Southern Football League clubs